Abbotsfield is a road within the suburb of Claremont in the northern suburbs of Hobart, capital of Tasmania, Australia. It is in the local government area of Glenorchy. The area is situated slightly to the west of Austins Ferry. The road is split in two (north/south) by the Brooker Highway, and is most obvious when travelling along Abbotsfield Road.

Amenities
Abbotsfield Primary School
BP Service Station

References

Suburbs of Hobart